Evil laughter or maniacal laughter is manic laughter by a villain in fiction. The expression dates to at least 1860. "Wicked laugh" can be found even earlier, dating back to at least 1784. Another variant, the "sardonic laugh," shows up in 1714 and might date back even further. A 2018 paper argued that this specific type of laugh has foundations in human psychology.

In comic books, where supervillains utter such laughs, they are variously rendered as mwahahaha, muwhahaha, muahahaha, bwahahaha, etc. These words are also commonly used on internet blogs, bulletin board systems, and games. There, they are generally used when some form of victory is attained, or to indicate superiority over someone else (ownage), or also mockingly at a statement one finds hard to believe was uttered in earnestness.

During the 1930s, the popular radio program The Shadow used a signature evil laugh as part of its presentation. This was a rare case of a non-villain character using an evil laugh, and it was voiced by actor Frank Readick. His laugh was used even after Orson Welles took over the lead role. Actor Vincent Price's evil laugh has been used or copied many times in radio, film, music, and television, notably at the end of the music video Michael Jackson's Thriller.

In films, evil laughter often fills the soundtrack when the villain is off-camera. In such cases, the laughter follows the hero or victim as they try to escape. An example of this is in Raiders of the Lost Ark, where Belloq's laugh fills the South American jungle as Indiana Jones escapes from the Hovitos.

References

1860s neologisms
Sound effects
Humour
Interjections
Laughter
Good and evil

fi:Nauraminen#Paha nauru